Senewosret-Ankh was an ancient Egyptian vizier of the Middle Kingdom, dating to the end of the Twelfth or to the beginning of the Thirteenth Dynasty, around 1800 BC. He is known from a number of sources making it possible to reconstruct his career. He started as 'personal scribe of the king's document and was appointed from there to the overseer of fields. From this position he was most likely appointed to the position of the vizier. As vizier he is known from a statue found at Ugarit. The statue shows him and his wife Henutsen as well as his daughter Zatamun. The statue also mentioned that to him was given the gold of praise in front of all courtiers. It remains unknown for what reason he received that honour. A stela now in Florence is dedicated to Senewosret-Ankh by his steward Keki, one of the administrators of Senewosret-Ankh's estates.

Literature 
Wolfram Grajetzki: Court Officials of the Egyptian Middle Kingdom, London 2009 p. 35

References

Viziers of the Twelfth Dynasty of Egypt
19th-century BC people
Officials of the Thirteenth Dynasty of Egypt